Usher's Island may refer to:

Usher's Island (Dublin), an area located around the Dublin quays
Usher's Island (band), an Irish folk group formed in 2015